Rockford is an unincorporated community in Chariton County, in the U.S. state of Missouri.

History
A post office called Rockford was established in 1893, and remained in operation until 1925. The community was named for a rocky ford near the original town site.

References

Unincorporated communities in Chariton County, Missouri
Unincorporated communities in Missouri